Zephyr is an unincorporated community located in Brown County, Texas, United States. According to the Handbook of Texas, the community had an estimated population of 198 in 2000.

Geography
Zephyr is situated along U.S. Highway 84 in southeastern Brown County, about 12 miles east of Brownwood, 42 miles east of Coleman, and 54 miles southwest of Stephenville.

History
The community was initially located on the banks of Blanket Creek in 1850. The name Zephyr, meaning soft, gentle wind, was first used by land surveyors who were trapped in the area during a blue norther. In 1863, the Lazarus Vann family arrived in the vicinity. They were joined by other families over the next few years. Zephyr's first store opened in 1878 and a post office was established the following year. In 1885, the Gulf, Colorado and Santa Fe Railway completed a line from Brownwood to Lampasas that missed Zephyr by roughly a mile. Store owner J.M. Wilson moved his store and the post office one mile west of the community's initial location to its present site. The community later became a station on the railroad. On May 30, 1909, an F4 tornado struck Zephyr, killing 34 people and injuring 70. Most of the deaths occurred in residential areas on the southern and eastern sides of the community. To date, the Zephyr tornado remains one of the deadliest tornadoes in the state's history. The community rebuilt and experienced a long period of growth. By 1940, the population stood around 750. Zephyr's economy was dependent on cotton, but a boll weevil infestation and deteriorating market conditions caused the community's last gin to close in the early 1940s. The population had fallen below 300 during the 1960s and remained at that level into the 1970s. During the final decades of the 20th century, Zephyr was home to around 198 people and had two businesses. That figure remained constant through 2000. In 1989, Zephyr had First Baptist, Methodist, and Churches of Christ and was a farming and ranching community.

Zephyr has a post office with the zip code 76890.

Education
Zephyr's first school was founded in 1876. A new school building was built in 1940 and remained in operation until the end of the 1980s.

Public education in the community of Zephyr is provided by the Zephyr Independent School District. The district has one campus that includes Zephyr Elementary School (grades PreK–5), Zephyr Junior High (grades 6–8), and Zephyr High School (grades 9–12). The district was voted to be independent so that the small number of students who lived there would not have to be bussed to another school nearby.

In 2009, Mandi Moore enlisted the help of Joyce Baker, who attended the same church that she attended and was a school board member in the community, to build Cross Classical Academy.

References

Unincorporated communities in Texas
Unincorporated communities in Brown County, Texas